Zinaida Alexandrovna Kupriyanovich (born 17 September 2002), sometimes known professionally as Zina Kupriyanovich or Zena (stylized as ZENA), and now known as Zina Bless, is a Belarusian singer, actress, and television presenter. Kupriyanovich represented Belarus in the Eurovision Song Contest 2019 with the song "Like It", placing 24th in the final. She has additionally cohosted the Junior Eurovision Song Contest 2018 in Minsk, and voiced the Russian dub of the eponymous character in the film Moana (2016).

Career
Kupriyanovich began her career as a child singer in 2013, competing in New Wave Junior 2013 and 2014 Junior Slavianski Bazaar in Vitebsk.

Kupriyanovich competed in the Belarusian national final for the Junior Eurovision Song Contest twice; she placed fourth in 2015 with the song "Mir" and third in 2016 with the song "Kosmos". In 2017, she placed third in the tenth season of Fabrika Zvyozd, the Russian version of Operación Triunfo. As an actress, she has voiced the Russian dub of the character Moana in the films Moana and Ralph Breaks the Internet.

She represented Belarus in the Eurovision Song Contest 2019 with the song "Like It". She qualified to the final, where she scored 31 points, finishing 24th out of 26 countries. Since the 2020 contest was cancelled, and Belarus was disqualified from the 2021 contest, and banned from entering future contests, Kupriyanovich remains the last Belarusian representative at the Eurovision Song Contest for the time being.

Discography

Singles

EPs

Filmography

Notes

References

External links

2002 births
21st-century Belarusian actresses
21st-century Belarusian women singers
Belarusian child singers
Eurovision Song Contest entrants for Belarus
Belarusian film actresses
Belarusian pop singers
Belarusian television presenters
Child pop musicians
Eurovision Song Contest entrants of 2019
Musicians from Minsk
Living people
Belarusian women television presenters
Actors from Minsk